Puerto Villarroel Municipality is the fifth municipal section of the Carrasco Province in the Cochabamba Department, Bolivia. Its seat is Puerto Villarroel.

The people 
The people are predominantly indigenous citizens of Quechuan descent.  There are also groups of Yuracaré.

Languages 
The languages spoken in the municipality are mainly Quechua and Spanish.

References 

 Instituto Nacional de Estadistica de Bolivia

External links 
 Population data and map of Puerto Villarroel Municipality

Municipalities of the Cochabamba Department